20th Century Fox World (Dubai) is a cancelled theme park in Dubai, United Arab Emirates, initially scheduled to open in 2020. The park was slated to feature attractions based on various Fox-owned film and television franchises, such as Alien, Blue Sky Studios films, Family Guy, The Simpsons, Planet of the Apes, and Anastasia.

The park was owned by Al Ahli Holding Group, under license from The Walt Disney Company.

Development
20th Century Fox World (Dubai) was announced on 3 November 2015, when 20th Century Fox and Al Ahli Holding Group made their licensing deal to build the theme park for $850 million, while 20th Century Fox World in Malaysia was also in development.

On 29 April 2018, the park was put on indefinite hold by the Al Ahli Group amid concerns from its CEO Mohammed Khammas that there was a "serious supply" of theme parks in Dubai.

References

Amusement parks in Dubai
20th Century Studios
Walt Disney Parks and Resorts
Unbuilt buildings and structures in the United Arab Emirates